Lieutenant-Colonel Martin Michael Charles Charteris, Baron Charteris of Amisfield,  (7 September 1913 – 23 December 1999) was a British Army officer and courtier of Queen Elizabeth II. Charteris was the longest-serving Assistant Private Secretary to the Sovereign, having served for over 20 years in that position. Later, he became Private Secretary to the Sovereign.

Early life and education
Charteris was the second of two sons born to Hugo Francis Charteris, Lord Elcho (1884–1916), and Lady Violet Catherine Manners (died 1971). His paternal grandparents were The 11th Earl of Wemyss and Mary Constance Wyndham, and his maternal grandparents were The 8th Duke of Rutland and Violet Lindsay. His father, a barrister, was killed in action in Egypt in the First World War, and his mother remarried in 1922. His brother, David, succeeded as 12th Earl of Wemyss following the death of their grandfather in 1937.

He was educated at Eton and the Royal Military College, Sandhurst, and was commissioned in the King's Royal Rifle Corps. He fought in the Middle East during the Second World War, rising to the rank of lieutenant-colonel. On his return, he married the Hon. Mary Margesson (a daughter of the 1st Viscount Margesson) on 16 December 1944 in Jerusalem and they had three children. He retired from the Army in 1951.

Career
In 1950, he was appointed Private Secretary to Princess Elizabeth, who was then Duchess of Edinburgh and heir presumptive to the British throne. From her accession in 1952 until 1972, he served as her Assistant Private Secretary under Sir Michael Adeane. On Adeane's retirement in 1972, he was promoted to Private Secretary. He held this post until his retirement in 1977 and returned to Eton as its Provost. He was granted the honour of being a Permanent Lord in Waiting.

Charteris was noted for his outspoken interview, given to The Spectator in 1995, in which he described the Duchess of York as "vulgar", the then Prince of Wales (now Charles III) as "whiny", and the Queen Mother as "a bit of an ostrich", who "doesn't look at" what she "doesn't want to see".

Honours

British honours
Officer of the Order of the British Empire (Military Division) in the 1946 Birthday Honours
Member of the Royal Victorian Order in the 1953 Coronation Honours
Companion of the Order of the Bath in the 1958 Birthday Honours
 Knight Commander of the Royal Victorian Order in the 1962 Birthday Honours
 He received the Queen Elizabeth II Version of the Royal Household Long and Faithful Service Medal in 1970 for 20 years' service to the Royal Family.
Knight Commander of the Order of the Bath in the 1972 Birthday Honours
Knight Grand Cross of the Royal Victorian Order in the 1976 New Year Honours
Knight Grand Cross of the Order of the Bath 11 August 1977
Queen's Service Order in the 1978 New Year Honours
Created a life peer as Baron Charteris of Amisfield, of Amisfield in the District of East Lothian on 7 February 1978
Royal Victorian Chain 7 July 1992

Foreign honours
 : Honorary Grand Commander of the Order of Loyalty to the Crown of Malaysia (1972)
: Grand Decoration of Honour in Silver for Services to the Republic of Austria in 1966

Portrayals
In the first two seasons of the Netflix series The Crown, Charteris was portrayed by Harry Hadden-Paton. In seasons 3 and 4, the more mature Charteris was played by Charles Edwards. Charteris retired in 1977 as Private Secretary. In The Crown he was portrayed as holding the office much longer than in reality.

References

External links
Grice, Elizabeth. "Perfect 10: The Men and Women Who Have Shaped the Queen" The Daily Telegraph, 1 June 2012. Retrieved 2 January 2020.

Charteris of Amisfield
Charteris of Amisfield
Charteris of Amisfield
Charteris of Amisfield
Charteris of Amisfield
Charteris of Amisfield
Charteris of Amisfield
Charteris of Amisfield
Recipients of the Grand Decoration for Services to the Republic of Austria
Commanders Crosses of the Order of Merit of the Federal Republic of Germany
Charteris of Amisfield
Charteris of Amisfield
Charteris of Amisfield
People educated at Eton College
Provosts of Eton College
Amisfield, Martin Charteris
Amisfield, Martin Charteris
Private Secretaries to the Sovereign
Assistant Private Secretaries to the Sovereign
1975 Australian constitutional crisis
Honorary Grand Commanders of the Order of Loyalty to the Crown of Malaysia
Martin
Life peers created by Elizabeth II